The 2019 Marshall Thundering Herd football team represented Marshall University in the 2019 NCAA Division I FBS football season. The Thundering Herd played their home games at Joan C. Edwards Stadium in Huntington, West Virginia, and competed in the East Division of Conference USA (CUSA). They were led by tenth-year head coach Doc Holliday. They lost to UCF in Gasparilla bowl.

Preseason

CUSA media poll
Conference USA released their preseason media poll on July 16, 2019, with the Thundering Herd predicted to finish in first place in the East Division.

Preseason All-CUSA teams
To be released

Schedule
Marshall announced its 2019 football schedule on January 10, 2019. The 2019 schedule consists of 7 home and 5 away games in the regular season.

Schedule Source:

Game summaries

VMI

at Boise State

Ohio

Cincinnati

at Middle Tennessee

Old Dominion

at Florida Atlantic

Western Kentucky

at Rice

Louisiana Tech

at Charlotte

FIU

vs. UCF (Gasparilla Bowl)

Players drafted into the NFL

References

Marshall
Marshall Thundering Herd football seasons
Marshall Thundering Herd football